Louis Deacon (born 7 October 1980, in Leicester) is a former English professional rugby union footballer. He played lock.

Career 
His playing career started as an eight-year-old, playing with Wigston, before joining Syston RFC and as a Ratcliffe College student represented the Midlands county and both the England 16 Group and U18 Group School sides. He joined the Leicester Tigers Academy in the 1997–98 season and worked his way through the Tigers Youth, U21 and Extras teams.

Deacon joined Leicester Tigers in 2000. He made his first team debut in August 2000 as a replacement against Cardiff and has established himself as a highly dependable player and equally at home at the front or middle of the line out. In the absence of club captain Geordan Murphy through injury, he has captained for spells in the 2009–10 season.

Deacon was part of the Leicester squads that won the 2007, 2009 and 2010 Premiership finals.

He was called up to the England A squad in the 2002–03 season but injury forced him to withdraw.

Having lived in the shadow of the England pairing of Martin Johnson and Ben Kay for several seasons, he took the opportunity in 2003–04 to command a regular place during the World Cup. He made 23 appearances in all that season, and by the end he was being picked ahead of Kay.

In September 2003 he was named in the England National Academy Training squad. He was called up to the elite squad for the 2005–6 season and went on to make his international debut against Samoa.

He was again named in the elite squad, in the 2006–07 season. For the 2007 Six Nations opener against Scotland, Deacon started at Lock under new head coach Brian Ashton.

He continued in this position, throughout the first three games of the tournament, and came off the bench against France and Wales in the final two games of the tournament.

Deacon would have to wait a further two years before winning another cap, playing in the two test series against Argentina. He made it into the EPS Elite squad for 2009–10, and partnered captain Steve Borthwick during the Autumn Internationals. He then went on to play in every RBS 6 Nations Championship match last season, as he had done three years earlier, which not only illustrated the skill, but the resolution of Deacon, who went on to miss the summer tour of Australasia and the Investec Internationals through a back injury, which was a similar injury to when he underwent surgery on a prolapsed disc in June 2008 that ruled him out of the Investec Challenge Series and the subsequent RBS 6 Nations Championship.

On 17 February 2015, it was announced Deacon had retired from rugby due to injury.

References

External links
 Louis Deacon Professional Rugby Player - website
 Leicester profile
 England profile

1980 births
Living people
England international rugby union players
English rugby union players
Leicester Tigers players
Rugby union locks
Rugby union players from Leicester
People educated at Ratcliffe College